Adrien Karbowsky (15 December 1855 – 14 March 1945) was a French painter, decorator and architect.
He is known for his Art Nouveau murals and tapestry designs.

Life

Adrien Karbowsky was born on 15 December 1855.
He was a pupil of Jean-Baptiste Lavastre, who decorated the Paris Opera, and of Justin Lequien.
Karbowski also studied under Pierre Puvis de Chavannes.
His Le bras Mignot, à Poissy was exhibited at the Salon of the Société des Artistes Français in 1881 in the Palais des Champs-Élysées, Paris.
On 1 May 1886 his Calendrier républicain was shown at the Salon.
At the Salon of 1889 he received an honorable mention.

Karbowsky became a leading decorator in the Art Nouveau style. 
He collaborated with Frantz Jourdain and Puvis de Chavannes.
Karbowsky was made a knight of the Legion of Honour in 1902.
He became a member of the Société de l'Art à L'École, founded in 1906 with the aim of improving public taste by teaching public school students about art and decorating the schools.
A reviewer for American Art News wrote in February 1918,

In 1923 Karbowsky was among the 27 dissenting members of the board of the Société Nationale des Beaux-Arts who formed a new and more eclectic Salon with the encouragement of the Minister of Fine Arts. The plan was to exhibit paintings and sculptures ranging in style from the most conservative to the most advanced. The Salon would be held in springtime, at the peak season for visitors to Paris.

Adrien Karbowsky died on 14 March 1945, aged 89.

Selected works

Karbowsky contributed decorative tapestry designs for the Manufacture Nationale des Gobelins.
He also designed tapestries for the Manufacture Nationale de Tapisseries de Beauvais.
He designed the decorative silk tapestries in pink for the Salon du Bois in the Museum of Decorative Arts, opened in 1900 in the Pavilion de Marsan of the Louvre Palace.
Murals include:
1893: Decorative murals in the Château de Verteuil, Charente, whose library Jourdain remodelled in 1893.
1903–07: With Louis Jaulmes, murals for the Villa Kerylos in Cap-Ferrat, as directed by the Hellenic scholar Théodore Reinach, in mythological scenes often copied from Attic pottery.
1909: Also with Jaulmes, decoration of the dining room of the exclusive Hôtel Royal in Évian-les-Bains.
Frescoes for the dining room of the Hôtel Lutétia in Paris and the Hôtel de Ville in Nogent-sur-Marne.
1920s Decoration of the Domaine de Montaigu in Nancy in collaboration with the local architect Pierre le Bourgeon. The house had been purchased in 1920 by the Salin family, but had burned down. It was restored using new  techniques such as reinforced concrete and a metal framework.
1925: Stenciled paintings for La Maison Commune du Chemin Vert in Reims, a theater inaugurated in February 1925
Murals for the dining room of the Prince of Monaco.

Salons and exhibitions

 1881: Salon des artistes français
 1886: Salon of the Société des artistes français
 1900: Exposition Universelle of Paris
 1907: Salon La Nationale des beaux-arts : Mimosas et faïences
 1910: Brussels International
 1913: Salon de la Société nationale des beaux-arts : Musiciens
 1923: Salon des Tuileries
 1928: Galerie Ecalle, 3 Faubourg-Saint-Honoré à Paris
 1945: Salon des Tuileries : Rétrospective de l'Œuvre d'Adrien Karbowsky

Notes

Sources

1855 births
1945 deaths
19th-century French painters
French male painters
20th-century French painters
20th-century French male artists
19th-century French male artists